Désiré Letort (29 January 1943 – 9 September 2012) was a French cyclist. His sporting career began with ACBB Paris.  His career best finishes in the Tour de France were 17th in  1971, 9th in  1969 and 4th in  1967.

Biography 
Letort was born in Corseul.  He won the French national road race championship in 1967, but after the race failed the doping tests.

Letort raced in eight Tours de France. He wore the yellow jersey in the 1969 Tour de France for one day after stage 5.

Major results
   
1963
French military champion

1966
Paris–Camembert
Sévignac
1967
 national road race championship 
Sévignac
1968
Critérium de Saint-Georges-de-Chesné
1969
Ploerdut
Laval
Plancoet
1970
Issé
Hénon
1971
Nice-Seillans

Grand tour results

Tour de France 
 1965 : DNF (=Did Not Finish)
 1966 : 57
 1967 : 4 (winner combativity award)
 1968 : DNF
 1969 : 9
 1970 : DNF
 1971 : 17
 1972 : DNF

Vuelta a España 
 1967 : 27
 1971 : 26
 1972 : DNF

Giro d'Italia 
 1972 : DNF

References

External links 
 
 
 Official Tour de France results

French male cyclists
1943 births
2012 deaths
Sportspeople from Côtes-d'Armor
Cyclists from Brittany